Kingsway Mall (formerly Kingsway Garden Mall) is a shopping centre located in central Edmonton, Alberta, Canada. The mall, constructed in 1976, completed a $70-million redevelopment from 2007–2009. The "Revealing" held at the weekend of 13 November 2009, saw the name change, introduced the public to the new mall, and opened the winter shopping season. Bordered by three major commuter roads (109 Street, Princess Elizabeth Avenue, and Kingsway), Kingsway Mall is situated near NAIT (Northern Alberta Institute of Technology) and the Royal Alexandra Hospital. On 14 March 2014, its Target location opened, but closed in 2015. Also, in 2015, Forever 21 opened in the former Smitty's and Sheffield Express. It also had the last Smart Set in Edmonton. Hot Topic opened in the mall in the Fall of 2015, and it is the first in Edmonton. In 2017, they announced they would go under a renovation adding a new wing of the mall in the former Target. On July 8, 2021, Walmart announced that it would be exiting its current Westmount Centre Location and relocating to Kingsway Mall in the former Sears space on October 20, 2022. A portion of the former Sears where the store's Sears Home entrance and section were located, was not taken over by Walmart, and that space will be replaced by Fit 4 Less, which will open on February 22, 2023.

General information

Kingsway Mall is the second largest mall in Edmonton, behind West Edmonton Mall. The mall contains over 174 stores and services including Hudson's Bay, Sport Chek, H&M, and Marshalls/HomeSense. The mall has two main shopping levels (with one store situated in the basement) and a third floor consisting of professional offices. Over 3,755 parking stalls surround the mall, in two levels on the east side, as well as Edmonton Transit System services at the Kingsway/Royal Alex station.

Current anchors

Hudson's Bay 
Marshalls (opened in 2018 in former Zellers/Target upper level)
HomeSense (opened in 2018 in former Zellers/Target lower level)
H&M (originally opened around 2010-2012, moved in 2018 to former Zellers/Target lower level, original store replaced by Urban Planet)
Dollarama (opened 2021 in former Zellers/Target upper level)
Sport Chek
Urban Planet (opened in 2018 in original H&M location, H&M moved to former Zellers/Target lower level)
Forever 21 (originally opened 2015, replacing Smitty's & Sheffield Express, which closed around 2014-2015 (Sheffield Express relocated), closed around 2019-2020, replaced by Urban Behaviour in 2020, UB's lease expired and Forever 21 returned in 2021)
Walmart (opened October 20, 2022, in the former Sears space and moved from the Westmount Centre location)
Fit 4 Less (will open February 22, 2023 in the Sears Home entrance and section of the former Sears which was not taken over by Walmart)

Former anchors
Sears: Closed January 8, 2018; replaced with Walmart on October 20, 2022, and a space portion not used by Walmart will be replaced with Fit 4 Less on February 22, 2023
Zellers: Closed 2013, replaced with Target Canada on March 14, 2014, which later closed on March 15, 2015, now Marshalls/Dollarama on the upper level, H&M/HomeSense on the lower level.
Target: Formerly Zellers, Opened on March 14, 2014, Closed on March 15, 2015, now Marshalls/Dollarama on the upper level, H&M/HomeSense on the lower level
Urban Behaviour: Replaced original Forever 21 in 2020, lease expired in 2021, reverted back to Forever 21
SuperValu: Closed 1980s

Gallery

See also
List of largest shopping malls in Canada

References

External links
 

Shopping malls in Edmonton
Shopping malls established in 1976
Tourist attractions in Edmonton
Oxford Properties
1976 establishments in Alberta